Crotaphopeltis hotamboeia, commonly known as the herald snake or the red-lipped snake, is a species of snake in the family Colubridae. The species is endemic to Sub-Saharan Africa.

Description
Crotaphopeltis hotamboeia can be identified by its olive green or grey body, multiple white speckles, distinctive black head, and red, yellow, white, or black upper lip.

Diet
C. hotamboeia feeds on amphibians (including rain frogs), lizards, and other snakes (only in captivity).

Longevity
The red-lipped snake has been known to live for between 10 and 15 years.

Reproduction
Adult females of C. hotamboeia lay between 6 and 19 eggs in early summer.

Geographic range
Endemic to Sub-Saharan Africa, the herald snake is present in Zambia, throughout South Africa (except for the Karoo and Northern Cape) as well as Lesotho, Eswatini, Zimbabwe, Nigeria, southern and central Mozambique, and northern Botswana.

Habitat
The herald snake favors marshy areas in lowland forest, moist savanna, grasslands, and fynbos.

References

Further reading
Boulenger GA (1896). Catalogue of the Snakes in the British Museum (Natural History). Volume III., Containing the Colubridæ (Opisthoglyphæ and Proteroglyphæ) ... London: Trustees of the British Museum (Natural History). (Taylor and Francis, printers). xiv + 727 pp. + Plates I-XXV. (Leptodira hotambœia, pp. 89–91).
Branch, Bill (2004). Field Guide to Snakes and other Reptiles of Southern Africa. Third Revised edition, Second impression. Sanibel Island, Florida: Ralph Curtis Books. 399 pp. . (Crotaphopeltis hotamboeia, p. 97 + Plate 33).
Laurenti JN (1768). Specimen medicum, exhibens synopsin reptilium emendatam cum cum experimentis circa venena et antidota reptilium austriacorum. Vienna: "Joan. Thom. Nob. de Trattern". 214 pp. + Plates I-V. (Coronella hotamboeia, new species, p. 85). (in Latin).

External links

Colubrids
Snakes of Africa
Reptiles of Angola
Reptiles of Botswana
Reptiles of Cameroon
Reptiles of the Central African Republic
Reptiles of the Democratic Republic of the Congo
Reptiles of Eswatini
Reptiles of Ethiopia
Reptiles of Gabon
Reptiles of Kenya
Reptiles of Lesotho
Reptiles of Malawi
Reptiles of Mozambique
Reptiles of Namibia
Reptiles of the Republic of the Congo
Reptiles of Somalia
Reptiles of South Africa
Reptiles of Tanzania
Reptiles of West Africa
Reptiles of Zambia
Taxa named by Josephus Nicolaus Laurenti
Reptiles described in 1768